"Behind the Red Door" is the sixth episode of the second season of the American television drama series The Americans, and the 19th overall episode of the series. It originally aired on FX in the United States on April 2, 2014.

Plot
Claudia (Margo Martindale) gives Elizabeth and Philip instructions on how to kill Larrick (Lee Tergesen) if they discover he is Emmett and Leanne's killer. Meanwhile, Stan meets Oleg in a safe house and is given three days to meet Oleg's demands. Later that day, Elizabeth and Philip meet Larrick, and he claims he wanted to kill Emmett and Leanne, but he didn't get to them first. Elizabeth and Philip believe him. Later that night, Elizabeth seduces Philip, wanting to meet "Clark," but Philip is confused and somewhat offended, and backs off. At the same time, Stan is home eating dinner while his wife and son talk about the death of John Belushi. He later goes to the copy room and goes through Oleg's surveillance logs.

Elizabeth keeps pressing Philip about Clark, but is interrupted when they discover Paige quit the volleyball team, and they need to meet Kate. Philip tells her he plans to kill Larrick after a mission and asks that his family remain unexposed. Kate accepts their request, and tells Elizabeth that Lucia needs to help her get into the Capitol. Lucia seduces the congressman's assistant, Carl, and lures him into the office to have sex while Elizabeth steals the files. After the success, Elizabeth tells Lucia to kill the assistant so nothing will be traced back to her.

Stan goes to Gaad's home, and tells him Nina has been compromised. Gaad refuses to hear anything so he won't have to lie if he is forced to testify before a congressional committee. Oleg meets Arkady and tells him the ARPANET is the future. When asked by Arkady if Stan will meet Oleg's demands, he replies "50-50". Elizabeth seduces Philip in his Clark costume and he sensually kisses her. Disappointed, she demands to see the animal Clark is instead of Philip's sensitive nature, and he relents by viciously having sex with her. He shouts at her "Is that what you want?", to her shock. Philip goes to the bathroom disgusted with himself and rips off his wig while Elizabeth is on the bed sobbing.

Lucia is with Carl and he says he wants her to meet his family. He prepares some heroin and she poisons it when he leaves the room to get her some water. Immediately after injecting the drug, he chokes on his vomit and dies. Elizabeth comes back home and Paige tells her she quit volleyball because she had more fun at church. Paige asks her parents to stop by sometime. Elizabeth later goes to Philip and asks "Are you mad at me?" Philip tells her he isn't, and asks her about Lucia.

Stan tells Nina that Oleg knows about them. Stan tells her that she will have to take a polygraph test to be exfiltrated, and she tells him she is done and storms out. Larrick confronts Philip at a mission, and Elizabeth asks Claudia whom to search next, and she replies "me". She told Elizabeth she was lonely and was in a relationship, and may have inadvertently led her lover to Emmett and Leanne. Claudia claims she told them to pursue the killer so they could remain safe from her. She also tells Elizabeth she is lucky to have Philip in her life before they finally part. The episode ends with Elizabeth driving away.

Production
The episode was written by Melissa James Gibson and directed by Charlotte Sieling.

Reception
The episode was viewed by 1.21 million viewers. The reviews for this episode were overwhelmingly positive, and The Wall Street Journal lauded the performances of Russell and Rhys. The A.V. Club rated gave the episode a perfect A. Alan Sepinwall from Hitfix reviewed the episode positively.

References

External links
 "Behind the Red Door" at FX
 

The Americans (season 2) episodes
2014 American television episodes